Ahantaman Girls' Senior High School is an educational institution for girls. It is located at Sekondi in the western region of Ghana. Ahantaman Girls' Senior High was established in 1948 by a business-inclined educationist called Mr. Emmanuel Kwasi Idun.

History
The school has changed over the years from a private to state ownership. The school was established in 1948 by a business-inclined educationist called Mr. Emmanuel Kwasi Idun. Originally, it started as Takoradi Commercial Academy near Sekondi. The school formally became known as Royal Commercial College popularly known as ROCCO.

In 1965, the Ghana Education Service absorbed the school into the secondary school system and as a result, the school changed its name to Royal Commercial Secondary School since both commercial and secondary subjects were studied, in short it was ROCSEC

In 1980,the school adopted a name from the traditional area which came to be known as Ahantaman Secondary School. Then it became Ahantaman Senior High School and the status of the school was changed on 17 November 2010 from a co-educational institution to a single sex school and this is Ahantaman Girls’ SHS.
In essence the school has different group of students: those of the Rococo days, Rosec, Ahantaman Secondary School days, Ahantaman Senior High School and Ahantaman Girls Senior High School which all fall under the same umbrella.

The School has of about one thousand five hundred students. It is both boarding and day.

Notable alumni
 Paapa Yankson - award-winning Ghanaian musician

References

External links

High schools in Ghana
Sekondi-Takoradi
Educational institutions established in 1948
1948 establishments in Gold Coast (British colony)
Girls' schools in Ghana
Education in the Western Region (Ghana)